In quantum information theory, mutually unbiased bases in Hilbert space Cd are two orthonormal bases  and  such that the square of the magnitude of the inner product between any basis states  and  equals the inverse of the dimension d:

These bases are unbiased in the following sense: if a system is prepared in a state belonging to one of the bases, then all outcomes of the measurement with respect to the other basis are predicted to occur with equal probability.

Overview 
The notion of mutually unbiased bases was first introduced by Schwinger in 1960, and the first person to consider applications of mutually unbiased bases was Ivanovic in the problem of quantum state determination.

Another area where mutually unbiased bases can be applied is quantum key distribution, more specifically in secure quantum key exchange. Mutually unbiased bases are used in many protocols since the outcome is random when a measurement is made in a basis unbiased to that in which the state was prepared. When two remote parties share two non-orthogonal quantum states, attempts by an eavesdropper to distinguish between these by measurements will affect the system and this can be detected. While many quantum cryptography protocols have relied on 1-qubit technologies, employing higher-dimensional states, such as qutrits, allows for better security against eavesdropping. This motivates the study of mutually unbiased bases in higher-dimensional spaces.

Other uses of mutually unbiased bases include quantum state reconstruction, quantum error correction codes, detection of quantum entanglement, and the so-called "mean king's problem".

Existence problem 
Let  denote the maximum number of mutually unbiased bases in the d-dimensional Hilbert space Cd. It is an open question how many mutually unbiased bases, one can find in Cd, for arbitrary d.

In general, if

is the prime-power factorization of d, where

then the maximum number of mutually unbiased bases which can be constructed satisfies

It follows that if the dimension of a Hilbert space d is an integer power of a prime number, then it is possible to find d + 1 mutually unbiased bases. Therefore,

Thus, the maximum number of mutually unbiased bases is known when d is an integer power of a prime number, but it is not known for arbitrary d.

Examples of sets of mutually unbiased bases

Example for d = 2 
The three bases

provide the simplest example of mutually unbiased bases in C2. The above bases are composed of the eigenvectors of the Pauli spin matrices  and their product , respectively.

Example for d = 4 
For d = 4, an example of d + 1 = 5 mutually unbiased bases where each basis is denoted by Mj, 0 ≤ j ≤ 4, is given as follows:

Methods for finding mutually unbiased bases

Weyl group method 
Let  and  be two unitary operators in the Hilbert space Cd such that

for some phase factor .

The elements of the Fourier matrix are given by

Other bases which are unbiased to both the standard basis and the basis generated by the Fourier matrix can be generated using Weyl groups. The dimension of the Hilbert space is important when generating sets of mutually unbiased bases using Weyl groups. When d is a prime number, then the usual d + 1 mutually unbiased bases can be generated using Weyl groups. When d is not a prime number, then it is possible that the maximal number of mutually unbiased bases which can be generated using this method is 3.

Unitary operators method using finite fields 

Then the eigenbases of the following d + 1 operators are mutually unbiased:

For odd d, the t-th eigenvector of the operator  is given explicitly by

When  is a power of a prime, we make use of the finite field  to construct a maximal set of d + 1 mutually unbiased bases. We label the elements of the computational basis of Cd using the finite field:
.

where

Then we form d + 1 sets of commuting unitary operators:

The joint eigenbases of the operators in one set are mutually unbiased to that of any other set. We thus have d + 1 mutually unbiased bases.

Hadamard matrix method 
Given that one basis in a Hilbert space is the standard basis, then all bases which are unbiased with respect to this basis can be represented by the columns of a complex Hadamard matrix multiplied by a normalization factor. For d = 3 these matrices would have the form

The problem of finding a set of k+1 mutually unbiased bases therefore corresponds to finding k mutually unbiased complex Hadamard matrices.

An example of a one parameter family of Hadamard matrices in a 4-dimensional Hilbert space is

The problem of finding a maximal set of MUBs when d = 6 
The smallest dimension that is not an integer power of a prime is d = 6. This is also the smallest dimension for which the number of mutually unbiased bases is not known. The methods used to determine the number of mutually unbiased bases when d is an integer power of a prime number cannot be used in this case. Searches for a set of four mutually unbiased bases when d = 6, both by using Hadamard matrices and numerical methods have been unsuccessful.

Entropic uncertainty relations and MUBs 
There is an alternative characterization of mutually unbiased bases that considers them in terms of uncertainty relations.

Entropic uncertainty relations are analogous to the Heisenberg uncertainty principle, and Maassen and Uffink found that for any two bases  and :

Entropic uncertainty relations are often preferable to the Heisenberg uncertainty principle, as they are not phrased in terms of the state to be measured, but in terms of c.

In scenarios such as quantum key distribution, we aim for measurement bases such that full knowledge of a state with respect to one basis implies minimal knowledge of the state with respect to the other bases. This implies a high entropy of measurement outcomes, and thus we call these strong entropic uncertainty relations.

For two bases, the lower bound of the uncertainty relation is maximized when the measurement bases are mutually unbiased, since mutually unbiased bases are maximally incompatible: the outcome of a measurement made in a basis unbiased to that in which the state is prepared in is completely random. In fact, for a d-dimensional space, we have:

If the dimension of the space is a prime power, we can construct d + 1 MUBs, and then it has been found that

which is stronger than the relation we would get from pairing up the sets and then using the Maassen and Uffink equation. Thus we have a characterization of d + 1 mutually unbiased bases as those for which the uncertainty relations are strongest.

Although the case for two bases, and for d + 1 bases is well studied, very little is known about uncertainty relations for mutually unbiased bases in other circumstances.

When considering more than two, and less than  bases it is known that large sets of mutually unbiased bases exist which exhibit very little uncertainty. This means merely being mutually unbiased does not lead to high uncertainty, except when considering measurements in only two bases. Yet there do exist other measurements that are very uncertain.

Mutually unbiased bases in infinite dimension Hilbert spaces 
While there has been investigation into mutually unbiased bases in infinite dimension Hilbert space, their existence remains an open question.

The existence of mutually unbiased bases in a continuous Hilbert space remains open for debate, as further research in their existence is required before any conclusions can be reached.

Weigert and Wilkinson were first to notice that also a linear combination of these operators have eigenbases, which have some features typical for the mutually unbiased bases.

References 

Quantum information theory